Scotochromogenic bacteria develop pigment in the dark. Runyon Group II nontuberculous mycobacteria such as Mycobacterium gordonae are examples but the term could apply to many other organisms.

References

Bacteria